Black Everything is a four-track EP from the alternative rock band Apologies, I Have None.

It is the first Apologies, I Have None release without founding member Dan Bond who left the band in early 2014.

Track listing

Personnel
Apologies, I Have None
 Josh Mckenzie - vocals/guitar
 PJ Shepherd - bass
 Joe Watson - drums

References

2014 EPs
Apologies, I Have None albums